Gavin Lindsay (born July 5, 1929) was a Canadian ice hockey player with the East York Lyndhursts. He won a silver medal at the 1954 World Ice Hockey Championships in Stockholm, Sweden.

References

1929 births
Living people
Canadian ice hockey goaltenders
East York Lyndhursts players